William Allen Stewart (called Will; 19 September 194324 March 1998) was a Bishop of Taunton whose brief tenure from June 1997 until his death March 1998 was one of the shortest in the Anglican Communion. He was also, at 6 feet 7 inches, one of its tallest.

Stewart was educated at Uppingham and Trinity College, Cambridge (where he gained a Cambridge Master of Arts {MA Cantab}). Made a deacon at Michaelmas 1968 (29 September) and ordained a priest the Michaelmas following (28 September 1969), both times by John Taylor, Bishop of Sheffield, at Sheffield Cathedral; he was a curate at Ecclesall then Cheltenham. Following this he was Vicar of St James, Gloucester then Rector of St Mary Magdalene, Torquay. A sideways move to St Mark, Oulton Broad led to promotion to be Rural Dean of Lothingland and finally, before his appointment to the episcopate, a Canon of Norwich Cathedral.

References

1943 births
People educated at Uppingham School
Alumni of Trinity College, Cambridge
Bishops of Taunton
20th-century Church of England bishops
1998 deaths